The 1988 Hockey East Men's Ice Hockey Tournament was the 4th Tournament in the history of the conference. It was played between March 3 and March 11, 1989. Quarterfinal and semifinal games were played at home team campus sites, while the final game was played at the Boston Garden in Boston, Massachusetts, the home venue of the NHL's Boston Bruins. This was the final year the Hockey East championship was decided at a home venue to one of its member teams (as of 2014). By winning the tournament, Northeastern received the Hockey East's automatic bid to the 1988 NCAA Division I Men's Ice Hockey Tournament.

Format
The tournament featured three rounds of play. The team that finishes in seventh place is ineligible for tournament play. In the quarterfinals, the third seed and sixth seeds, and the fourth seed and fifth seeds played a two-game series where the team that scored the most total goals was declared the winner and advanced to the semifinals. In the semifinals, the first seed and lowest remaining quarterfinalist and second seed and highest remaining quarterfinalist each play additional two-game series with the winners advancing to the single-elimination championship game. The tournament champion receives an automatic bid to the 1988 NCAA Division I Men's Ice Hockey Tournament.

Conference standings
Note: GP = Games played; W = Wins; L = Losses; T = Ties; PTS = Points; GF = Goals For; GA = Goals Against

Bracket

Teams are reseeded after the quarterfinals

Note: * denotes overtime period(s)

Quarterfinals

(3) Boston University vs. (6) Providence

(4) Lowell vs. (5) Boston College

Semifinals

(1) Maine vs. (6) Providence

(2) Northeastern vs. (4) Lowell

Championship

(1) Maine vs. (2) Northeastern

Tournament awards

All-Tournament Team
F Mike McHugh (Maine)
F Harry Mews (Northeastern)
F Rico Rossi (Northeastern)
F Mario Thyer (Maine)
D Jack Capuano (Maine)
D Brian Dowd (Northeastern)
G Bruce Racine* (Northeastern)
* Tournament MVP(s)

References

External links
Hockey East Online

Hockey East Men's Ice Hockey Tournament
HE tournament
Hockey East Men's